Resavica is a mining town located in the municipality of Despotovac, central Serbia. As of 2011 census, it has a population of 2,035 inhabitants.

Mining history
Resavica lies at the core of a brown coal basin of central-eastern Serbia. The coal was exploited in the area, with shafts in Senjski Rudnik, Strmosten and Jelovac since the mid-19th century. After World War II, the mines were nationalized, and a state-owned company "Senje-Resava Brown Coal Mines" was formed, with the seat in Resavica. It went through several renames and reorganizations, and today Resavica is the seat of mine company "Rembas", with shafts in Jelovac, Strmosten and Senjski Rudnik.

References

Populated places in Pomoravlje District
Coal mines in Serbia